Mufazzal Haider Chaudhury (22 July 1926 – 14 December 1971) was a prominent Bengali essayist, prized scholar of Bengali literature, educator and linguist of the Bengali language.

Early life and education
Born in Khalishpur village, in Noakhali in East Bengal to Bazlur Rahman Chaudhury and Mahfuza Khatun, Chaudhury lost his father when he was nine. Facing financial difficulties, his mother arranged for his education at the Ahmediya High English School, from where he passed his matriculation examination securing fourth place under the University of Calcutta. After passing his intermediate from the Dhaka College, he went to study Bengali honors at the Scottish Church College, in Kolkata. Later he moved to the Visva-Bharati University, where he studied Bengali under the syllabus of the University of Calcutta, and passed his honors as a non-collegiate student in 1946. He made history by becoming the first Muslim to stand first class first in the BA (honors) examination from the Bengali department of Calcutta University, that too with record marks and a gold medal. 
He was awarded 'Sahitya Bharati' by the Visva-Bharati University, Santiniketan. He topped his class in the master's examination in Shantiniketan.

Career
Chaudhury joined the Pakistan Radio in Dhaka in 1949, and was a lecturer at Jagannath College before becoming a teacher at the Department of Bengali at the University of Dhaka having actually to sit for another master's exam because DU wouldn't accept his Bishwabharati degree and again coming first in his class, in 1953, in Bengali from the University of Dhaka. He joined DU in 1955. In 1957, he joined the School of Oriental and African Studies to study linguistics for two years. His research on the works and the philosophy of Rabindranath Tagore was felicitated and in 1970, he became an external examiner for Bengali at the University of Dhaka.

Death
Chaudhury was one of the leading Bengali intellectuals who were killed by collaborators of Pakistan Army on 14 December, two days before the end of the Bangladesh Liberation War.

On 14 December, which is observed as Martyred Intellectuals Day, a group of Al-Badr people took away the eminent intellectual from his house. His wife, Dolly Chaudhury, recognized one of the Al-Badr militants when the cover that hid the assassin's face was pulled by her husband. The person was Chowdhury Mueen-Uddin.

On 3 November 2013, Chowdhury Mueen-Uddin, a Muslim leader based in London, and Ashrafuz Zaman Khan, based in the US, were sentenced in absentia after the court found that they were involved in the abduction and murders of 18 people – nine Dhaka University teachers including Chaudhury, six journalists, and three physicians – in December 1971.

See also
 1971 Bangladesh atrocities

References

1926 births
1971 deaths
People from Begumganj Upazila
Scottish Church College alumni
Dhaka College alumni
University of Calcutta alumni
University of Dhaka alumni
Academic staff of the University of Dhaka
Bangladeshi essayists
Bangladeshi murder victims
People murdered in Bangladesh
People killed in the Bangladesh Liberation War
20th-century essayists
Recipients of the Independence Day Award
Bangladeshi textbook writers